Nurmsi Airfield ; (also given as Koigi) was a Soviet Naval Aviation reserve airfield in Estonia located  east of Paide in Nurmsi. It was a former attack deployment base and was listed on a 1974 U.S. Department of Defense Global Navigation Chart No. 3 as having jet facilities. At the end of the Cold War the airfield was converted into farmland. Very little of the airfield establishment remains today.

References

Defunct airports in Estonia
Järva Parish
Soviet Naval Aviation bases
Buildings and structures in Järva County